José Ángel Cuerda Montoya (born 17 March 1934) is a Spanish politician of the Basque Nationalist Party (EAJ-PNV). He was the first democratically elected mayor of Vitoria-Gasteiz, serving from 1979 to 1999.

Cuerda was known for his promotion of the environment and green space in his city as well as championing sustainable city planning for the wellbeing of residents. Though officially a member of the right-wing PNV, he said in 2019 "I never received instructions from the PNV, nor did I stop being a member of left-wing movements in the Basque Country, Spain, or around the world".

References

1934 births
Living people
Basque Nationalist Party politicians
Eusko Alkartasuna Party politicians
Mayors of Vitoria-Gasteiz
People from Vitoria-Gasteiz
Basque academics
University of Valladolid alumni
Members of the 2nd Basque Parliament
Members of the 3rd Basque Parliament
Members of the 1st Congress of Deputies (Spain)
Members of the constituent Congress of Deputies (Spain)